The Most Outstanding Canadian Award is annually awarded to the best Canadian player in the Canadian Football League. The two nominees for the award are the Lew Hayman Trophy winner from the East Division, and the Dr. Beattie Martin Trophy winner from the West Division. The winner of the award is chosen by the Football Reporters of Canada since 1954. Players born outside Canada may win the award if they become citizens and attain National status.

Player achievements
The most wins by a player is four, for both Russ Jackson (completed in the 1969) and Tony Gabriel (completed in 1978).

The first two-time winner, and also the first to win the award in two consecutive seasons, is Normie Kwong, in 1955 and 1956. The first three-time winner is Jackson, achieved as of 1966, while Gabriel is the only player to win three consecutive awards, from 1976 through 1978.

When a Canadian player is voted the recipient of the CFL's overall Most Outstanding Player Award, they are, of course, the recipient of that same season's Most Outstanding Canadian Award. Only three players have achieved this recognition: Jackson (1963, 1966, 1969), Gabriel (1978) and Jon Cornish (2013).

CFL's Most Outstanding Canadian Award winners

Team achievements
Teams represented by Most Outstanding Canadian Award winners through the years.

Notes:

See also
 Dr. Beattie Martin Trophy
 Lew Hayman Trophy

References

Canadian Football League trophies and awards